Pustyn is a rural locality (a village) in Lipovskoye Rural Settlement, Kirillovsky District, Vologda Oblast, Russia. The population was 385 as of 2002.

Geography 
Pustyn is located 46 km northeast of Kirillov (the district's administrative centre) by road. Rogovskaya is the nearest rural locality.

References 

Rural localities in Kirillovsky District